How-to-vote cards (HTV) are small leaflets that are handed out by party supporters during elections in Australia. Voting in the Australian lower house uses a preferential voting system. Voters must rank every candidate on the ballot in order for their vote to count. There are often numerous candidates on the ballot, some with little public profile, so voters may find it difficult to decide on all of them. Parties produce how-to-vote cards ostensibly to help voters. They contain details about the candidate or party as well as instruction how to cast a ranked vote in the order that the party would prefer the voter follow.  The flow of preferences can assist the party dispersing the cards directly and indirectly help allied parties.

The use of HTV cards have benefited minor parties in a number of ways including increasing their chances of winning, punishing opponents and receiving policy commitments.  Sometimes "preference deals" are done between political parties so that they are favoured by each other's HTV cards.

Voters are under no obligation to follow the cards.

Preference Deals 
A major political strategy during Australian political campaigns are preference deals, which direct voters to preference candidates in a specific and desirable order.

These deals have a large impact especially in seats where voters select minor parties or independents above the major parties. 

For example, in the 2019 election over a quarter of voters preferenced a minor party/ independent candidate first on their ballots.  In the 2019 federal election, 82.2% of Greens preferences went to the Labor party, while the Coalition received about 65% of One Nation and United Australia Party preferences.

It is typical for the Greens to give preference to the ALP over the coalition. In the 2022 federal election, the UAP has preferenced the coalition in various marginal seats, increasing the likelihood of the coalition winning in these seats. 

Since the 1960s, reliance on how-to-vote cards has decreased, with less than 30% of voters reporting using them in their decision.

The HTV card in different locations

South Australia 
In South Australia a combined HTV card is displayed in the polling booths and early voting centres. Apart from saving paper, these combined HTVs are helpful for candidates who do not have the resources in manpower or funding to man every booth.

A how-to-vote card lodged with the Electoral Commission of South Australia for display in polling booths and early voting centres. These HTV cards are edited for size and do not display images or icons.

Victoria 
In Victoria HTV cards must be authorised by the Victorian Electoral Commission and meet certain regulations before they can be handed out on election day. Once the HTV card has been approved it can be handed out by the VEC employees in mobile hospital units and other non-regular booths.

References

External links

 The Importance Of How-To-Vote Cards
 Example images
 
 
 
 The 'How-to-vote' Cards used in Australia's elections that use preferential voting. Proportional Representation Society Of Australia.

Political terminology in Australia
Elections in Australia